Munna Kakoti (born 11 March 1954) is former Indian cricketer. He played first-class cricket for Assam. Kakoti was nicknamed as "Lilee" for his ferocious bowling.

References

External links
 

1954 births
Living people
Indian cricketers
Assam cricketers
Cricketers from Guwahati
Cricketers from Assam